Muscle Beach is a 1948 short documentary film directed by Joseph Strick and Irving Lerner, showing amateur athletes and bodybuilders at the original Muscle Beach in Santa Monica, California. The soundtrack consists of songs sung by Earl Robinson.

Muscle Beach and The Savage Eye (1959) were restored by the Academy Film Archive in 2009 and 2008, respectively. The films premiered in February 2009 at San Francisco Cinematheque.

References

External links

, posted by the Academy of Motion Picture Arts and Sciences

1948 films
1948 documentary films
1948 short films
1940s sports films
American short documentary films
American black-and-white films
1940s short documentary films
Films directed by Joseph Strick
Films directed by Irving Lerner
Documentary films about bodybuilding
Venice, Los Angeles
Documentary films about Los Angeles
Films scored by Earl Robinson
1940s English-language films
1940s American films